Jessica Helen Gillan ( Hamill, born 20 July 1990) is a New Zealand paralympic athlete and shotputter. She represented New Zealand at the 2008 Summer Paralympics in Beijing and the 2016 Summer Paralympics in Rio de Janeiro, the latter where she won a bronze medal in the Women's shot put F34.

At the 2010 Commonwealth Games she won a silver medal in the F34 Shot put for elite athletes with a disability.

At the 2015 IPC Athletics World Championships, Hamill won a silver medal in the women's shot put F34, earning her automatic qualification for the 2016 Summer Paralympics in Rio de Janeiro. She was officially confirmed to represent New Zealand at the Paralympics on 23 May 2016.

References

External links 
 
  (archive)
 
 Meet Our Paralympians: Jessica Hamill – Attitude Live video profile

1990 births
Living people
New Zealand female shot putters
Paralympic athletes of New Zealand
Paralympic bronze medalists for New Zealand
Paralympic medalists in athletics (track and field)
Athletes (track and field) at the 2008 Summer Paralympics
Athletes (track and field) at the 2016 Summer Paralympics
Medalists at the 2016 Summer Paralympics
Commonwealth Games silver medallists for New Zealand
Commonwealth Games medallists in athletics
Athletes (track and field) at the 2010 Commonwealth Games
People educated at Verdon College
Athletes (track and field) at the 2020 Summer Paralympics
Medallists at the 2010 Commonwealth Games